Giorgi Shengelaia (11 May 1937 – 17 February 2020) was a Georgian and Soviet film director. He directed 14 films since 1961. His film Pirosmani (a poetic film about the great Georgian primitive artist Niko Pirosmanishvili who worked circa 1915) won the Grand Prize at the Chicago International Film Festival in 1974 and went on to international critical acclaim. His 1985 film The Journey of a Young Composer was entered into the 36th Berlin International Film Festival where he won the Silver Bear for Best Director.

Filmography

References

External links 

1937 births
2020 deaths
Writers from Moscow
Mingrelians
Film directors from Georgia (country)
Soviet film directors
Soviet screenwriters
Male screenwriters
Silver Bear for Best Director recipients